The 2014 County Championship season, known as the LV= County Championship for sponsorship reasons, was the 115th cricket County Championship season. It was contested through two divisions: Division One and Division Two. Each team played all the others in their division both home and away.

Teams

Division One
 Team promoted from Division Two

Division Two
 Team relegated from Division One

Standings
Teams receive 16 points for a win, 8 for a tie and 5 for a draw. Bonus points (a maximum of 5 batting points and 3 bowling points) may be scored during the first 110 overs of each team's first innings.

Division One

Division Two

Results summary
The fixtures for 2014 were announced in November 2013.

Division One

Division Two

Results in full

Division One

April

May

June

July

August

September

Division Two

April

May

June

July

August

September

Statistics

Division One

Most runs

Most wickets

Division Two

Most runs

Most wickets

See also
2014 Royal London One-Day Cup
2014 NatWest t20 Blast

References

2014
County Championship